The CNNA HL-6 was a civil trainer aircraft developed in Brazil in 1943.

Development
The HL-6 was a low-wing cantilever monoplane of conventional configuration.  It employed a fixed tailskid undercarriage.  The student and instructor sat in tandem, in open cockpits.

Variants
HL-6 - prototype.  One built
HL-6A - similar to prototype but with more powerful engine.  Five units were constructed in 1943.
HL-6B Cauré - Similar to HL-6A but with more powerful engine  Lycoming O-290C, and optional enclosed cabin.  39 units were constructed in 1944.

Specifications (HL-6B Cauré trainer)

References

Further reading

External links
 São Paulo Technical Museum website

HL-6
1940s Brazilian civil trainer aircraft
Low-wing aircraft
Single-engined tractor aircraft